Brian Robert Schmack (born December 7, 1973) is an American baseball coach and former relief pitcher, who is the current head baseball coach of the Valparaiso Beacons.

Playing career
Schmack played college baseball at Northern Illinois Huskies for coach Spanky McFarland from 1992 to 1995. He went undrafted out of Northern Illinois in 1995 and played for the independent Newark Bison of the Frontier League. In 1996, the Chicago White Sox signed him to a minor league deal. 

Schmack spent five seasons in the White Sox' organization. After the 2000 season, the White Sox traded Schmack and Aaron Myette to the Texas Rangers for Royce Clayton. Schmack spent three seasons in the Rangers' organization before signing with the Detroit Tigers on November 19, 2002. He made his major league debut with the Tigers in 2003, playing 11 games with a 3.46 earned run average. In 2004, his final professional season, he pitched for the Double-A Erie SeaWolves and the Triple-A Toledo Mud Hens in the Tigers' organization.

Coaching career
In 2007, Valparaiso University hired Schmack to be the pitching coach for the Valparaiso Beacons baseball team. He was promoted to associate head coach in 2011, and promoted to head coach prior to the 2014 season.

Yearly records
Below is a table of Schmack's yearly records as an NCAA head baseball coach.

See also
List of current NCAA Division I baseball coaches

References

External links

1973 births
Living people
Detroit Tigers players
Major League Baseball pitchers
Newark Bison players
Hickory Crawdads players
Winston-Salem Warthogs players
Birmingham Barons players
Charlotte Knights players
Oklahoma RedHawks players
Tulsa Drillers players
Northern Illinois Huskies baseball players
Erie SeaWolves players
Toledo Mud Hens players
Valparaiso Beacons baseball coaches
Baseball players from Chicago